Alexandre Iddir (born 21 February 1991) is a French judoka. He represented his country at the 2016 Summer Olympics.

References

External links
 
 
 
 
 

1991 births
Living people
French male judoka
Judoka at the 2016 Summer Olympics
Olympic judoka of France
Universiade medalists in judo
Sportspeople from Seine-Saint-Denis
Mediterranean Games bronze medalists for France
Mediterranean Games medalists in judo
Competitors at the 2018 Mediterranean Games
Universiade silver medalists for France
European Games competitors for France
Judoka at the 2015 European Games
Medalists at the 2011 Summer Universiade
Judoka at the 2020 Summer Olympics
Medalists at the 2020 Summer Olympics
Olympic medalists in judo
Olympic gold medalists for France

French sportspeople of Algerian descent
21st-century French people